Dimitrios Magafinis (born 11 May 1968) is a Greek football manager.

References

1968 births
Living people
Greek football managers
A.P.S. Zakynthos managers
Diagoras F.C. managers
P.A.S. Korinthos managers
Tilikratis F.C. managers
People from Thasos
Footballers from Eastern Macedonia and Thrace